Teluk Wondama Regency or Wondama Bay Regency is a regency of West Papua province of Indonesia. It covers a land area of 14,953.80 km2, and had a population of 26,321 at the 2010 Census and 41,644 at the 2020 Census. The administrative centre lies in the village of Rasiei.

Geography
Geographically, the district is located between 132°35' - 134°45' East Longitude and 0°15' - 3°25' South Latitude.

Most of the islands in Wondama Bay regency are surrounded by coral reef that is teeming with rich marine life. Rasiei, the capital of Wondama is located at the foot of Wondiboy mountains which is covered by pristine tropical rainforest. The coral reef and tropical rainforest have become important tourist attractions in this regency. The Department of Tourism and Culture of Wondama regency, in cooperation with the Indonesian Tourist Guide Association, has launched a website called Wondama Tourism to attract visitors to the regency.

Administrative Districts
The regency comprises thirteen districts (kecamatan), tabulated below with their populations at the 2010 Census and the 2020 Census. The table also includes the location of the district administrative centres, the number of administrative villages (desa and kelurahan, 76 in total) in each district and its post code.

Note that Roswar and Rumberpon Districts are each formed by an island of the same name (surrounded by numerous offshore islets) situated in Cenderawasih Bay, while Roon District encompasses 29 disparate islands in the same bay - including Roon, Rarief, Rariau, Ripon, Pinai and Manupaseh Islands, and the Rouw Archipelago. Roon District comprises seven villages, all on Roon Island (there are no villages on the smaller islands within the district) - Menarbu (which had 208 inhabitants at the 2020 Census), Sariay (with 14 inhabitants), Niab (227), Inday (235), Syabes (509), Mena (228) and Yende (414).

References

External links
Statistics publications from Statistics Indonesia (BPS)

Regencies of West Papua (province)